Barcsi SC is a Hungarian football club located in Barcs, Hungary. It currently plays in Hungarian National Championship II. The team's colors are white and red.

Football clubs in Hungary
Association football clubs established in 1910
1910 establishments in Hungary